Red Ghost may refer to:

Red Ghost (folklore), a 19th-century ghost seated on a camel
Red Ghost (character), a villain appearing in Marvel Comics
Red Ghost Cave Archeological District is a 10-acre (4.0 ha) archeological site in Oklahoma
Lady in Red (ghost), a type of female ghost, similar to the White Lady
The Red Ghost, a 2021 Russian film